This is a list of aircraft in alphabetical order beginning with 'R'.

Ra

Ra-Son 
 Ra-Son Warrior

Raab
(Fritz Raab)
 Raab Krähe
 Raab R2
 Raab Doppelraab	
 Pützer Motorraab - built by Alfons Pützer

Raab
(Antonius Raab - Estonia)
 Raab Schwalbe
 Raab Schwalbe II

Raab-Katzenstein 
(Raab-Katzenstein Flugzeugwerk GmbH (RaKa) - Antonius RAAB & Kurt KATZENSTEIN)
 Raab-Katzenstein KL.1 Schwalbe
 Raab-Katzenstein RK.2 Pelikan
 Raab-Katzenstein RK.6 Kranich - 2-seat biplane trainer, Mercedes (?), e.g. D-1061, '70, D-1152, '56
 Raab-Katzenstein RK.7 Schmetterling (Butterfly), parasol monoplane glider
 Raab-Katzenstein RK.8 Marabu
 Raab-Katzenstein RK.9 Grasmücke
 Raab-Katzenstein RK.22 (Opel-Raab-Katzenstein (RK 9 with solid-propellant Sander rocket)
 Raab-Katzenstein RK.25 (at least two - named Erka & Ruhrland)
 Raab-Katzenstein RK.25/32
 Raab-Katzenstein RK.26 Tigerschwalbe (Tiger Swallow[tail]), 2-seat biplane trainer
 Raab-Katzenstein RK.26a
 Raab-Katzenstein RK.27 (blimp)
 Raab-Katzenstein RK.29
 Raab-Katzenstein RK.32
 ASJA Sk.10 Tigerschwalbe, rights acquired from Anatole Gobiet
 Pintsch Schwalbe II (RK-1 derivative))
 Pintsch TigerSchwalbe
 Rheinische FR-2 Schwalbe (RK-1 derivative))
 Raab-Katzenstein Bleriot XI replica
 Raab-Katzenstein F 1 Tigerschwalbe (production transition to Fieseler F 1)
 Pintsch TigerSchwalbe
 Fieseler Fi-1 D-1616/D-EVUK (W.Nr.103)

Raache 
 Raache LR-1

Rabouyt
 Rabouyt D2

Raceair Designs
Raceair Skylite
 Raceair Lil Bitts

Rackett 
(William Rackett, Byron Center, MI)
 Rackett A

Rad Aviation
(Kidlington, United Kingdom)
Rad Arrow
Rad MXL
Rad RXL
Rad SXL Custom

Radioplane 
(Reginald Denny Hobby Shops / Radioplane)
 Radioplane OQ-1
 Radioplane OQ-2
 Radioplane OQ-3
 Radioplane OQ-6
 Radioplane OQ-6A
 Radioplane OQ-7
 Radioplane OQ-13
 Radioplane OQ-14
 Radioplane OQ-19
 Radioplane Q-1
 Radioplane Q-3
 Radioplane Q-4
 Radioplane RP-1
 Radioplane RP-2
 Radioplane RP-3
 Radioplane RP-4
 Radioplane RP-5
 Radioplane RP-14
 Radioplane RP-15
 Radioplane RP-61
 Radioplane RP-70
 Radioplane RP-71 Falconer
 Radioplane RP-76
 Radioplane RP-77
 Radioplane RP-78
 Radioplane RP-86
 Radioplane Dennymite
 Radioplane XKD4R
 Radioplane MQM-33
 Radioplane AQM-35
 Radioplane MQM-36 Shelduck
 Radioplane AQM-38
 Radioplane MQM-57 Falconer
 Radioplane KD2R Quail
 Radioplane BTT
 Radioplane TDD-1, target (1939)

RAE
(Aero Club of the Royal aircraft Establishment)
 RAE Zephyr
 RAE Scarab
 RAE Hurricane

Rafaelyants 
 Rafaelyants PR-5
 Rafaelyants PR-12
 Rafaelyants RAF-1
 Rafaelyants RAF-2
 Rafaelyants RAF-11
 Rafaelyants RAF-11bis
 Rafaelyants Turbolyet
 Rafaelyants izdeliye O

Ragot 
(Henri & Louis Ragot, Adrien Lacroix, New York NY.)
 Ragot 1911 Monoplane

RagWing 
 RagWing RW1 Ultra-Piet
 RagWing RW2 Special I
 RagWing RW4 Midwing Sport
 RagWing RW5 Heath Replica
 RagWing RW6 Rag-A-Muffin
 RagWing RW7 Duster
 RagWing RW8 PT2S
 RagWing RW9 Motor Bipe
 RagWing RW11 Rag-A-Bond
 RagWing RW16 Aerial
 RagWing RW19 Stork
 RagWing RW20 Stork side-by-side
 RagWing RW22 Tiger Moth
 RagWing RW26 Special II

Rahn 
(Rahn Aircraft Corp, Brooklyn NY.)
 Rahn 1935 rotary wing

Raiche 
(François & Bessica Raiche, Mineola NY.)
 Raiche 1910 Biplane

Rainbow 
(Rainbow Aircraft, Edenvale, Gauteng, South Africa)
 Rainbow Aerotrike Cobra
 Rainbow Aerotrike Safari
 Rainbow Aerotrike Scout
 Rainbow Aerotrike Spirit
 Rainbow Cheetah
 Rainbow Cheetah XLS
 Rainbow Skyreach Bush Cat

Raisner Aircraft Depot
(Part of Leading Edge Air Foils, Peyton Colorado)
Raisner Graffiti

Raj Hamsa 
 Raj Hamsa X-Air S (Standard)
 Raj Hamsa X-Air F Gumnam
 Raj Hamsa X-Air H Hanuman

Ralph
(Paul F. Ralph)
 Ralph Santa Ana

Ramor
(Ramor Flugzeugbau / Albert Kalkert)
Ramor K.E. 14

Ramphos
(Ramphos Inc, Fontanafredda, Italy)
Ramphos C
Ramphos Hydro
Ramphos Trident

Ramsey 
(W H Ramsey, Minneapolis MN.)
 Ramsey Flying Bath Tub

Rand-Robinson 
(Rand-Robinson Engineering Inc, Huntington Beach CA.)
 Rand Robinson KR-1
 Rand Robinson KR-1A
 Rand Robinson KR-2
 Rand Robinson KR-3

Ranger 
(Glenn Wade & Harmon Gum, Long Beach CA.)
 Ranger M-1

Ranger 
(Ranger Aircraft Corp, Oklahoma City)
 Ranger 1929 Monoplane
 Ranger C-1 a.k.a. Hunt Racer
 Ranger Cadet
 Ranger SR-3-1
 Ranger Trainer
 Ranger W

Rankin 
((John G "Tex") Rankin School of Flying/Rankin System; Portland OR.)
 Rankin EX-1
 Rankin RBM-4

Rans 
 Rans S-4 Coyote
 Rans S-5 Coyote
 Rans S-6 Coyote II
 Rans S-7 Courier
 Rans S-9 Chaos
 Rans S-10 Sakota
 Rans S-11 Pursuit
 Rans S-12 Airaile
 Rans S-14 Airaile
 Rans S-16 Shekari
 Rans S-17 Stinger
 Rans S-18
 Rans S-19 Venterra
 Rans S-20 Raven
 Rans S-21 Outbound

Rasmussen 
(Hans L Rasmussen, Niles MI.)
 Rasmussen Skippy

Rathel 
((Fred) Rathel Motor Co, Daleville or Farmland or Portland IL.)
 Rathel 1930 Monoplane

Rausch 
(Rausch Engineering Inc, South San Francisco CA.)
 Rausch Star 250

Raven
(Raven Aircraft Corporation, Surrey, British Columbia, Canada)
Raven 2XS

Raven
(Raven Rotorcraft)
 Raven Explorer I
 Raven Explorer II
 Raven Rotor-Plane

Ravin Aircraft
(SA Ravin Aircraft, Pretoria, South Africa)
Ravin 500
Ravin 700

Rawdon 
((Alanson "Dutch," Gene, Herb) Rawdon Bros Aircraft Co, Wichita)
 Rawdon R-1
 Rawdon T-1

Rayner 
(Herb Rayner)
 Rayner Pusher

Raytheon 
 Raytheon 390 Premier I
 Raytheon Sentinel
 Raytheon Beechcraft 1900
 Raytheon Beechcraft Baron
 Raytheon Beechcraft Bonanza
 Raytheon Beechcraft King Air
 Raytheon Beech T-6 Texan II
 Raytheon Beechjet 400
 Raytheon Hawker 400XP (Raytheon Beechjet 400)
 Raytheon Hawker 800
 Raytheon Hawker 1000
 Raytheon Hawker 4000
 Raytheon AQM-37 Jayhawk
 Raytheon CT-156 Harvard II Canadian Armed Forces

RBVZ 
(RBVZ Russko-Baltiisky Vagon Zavod - Russo-Baltic wagon works)
 RBVZ S-6
 RBVZ S-7
 RBVZ S-8 Malyutka
 RBVZ S-9 Kruglyi
 RBVZ S-10
 RBVZ S-11
 RBVZ S-12
 RBVZ S-XVI
 RBVZ S-XVII
 RBVZ S-XVIII
 RBVZ S-XIX
 RBVZ S-XX
 RBVZ S-22
 RBVZ S-23
 RBVZ S-24
 RBVZ S-25
 RBVZ S-26
 RBVZ S-27
 RBVZ Alexander Nevsky (1916 replacement for the IM)
 RBVZ Ilya Muromets
 RBVZ le Grand
 RBVZ Bolshoi Baltiiski
 RBVZ Russky Vityaz

RDD Enterprises
 RDD Enterprises LX7

Reaction Engines 
 Reaction Engines A2

Read 
(David B Read, Oshkosh WI.)
 Read S-4

Read 
(George Read Jr, St Petersburg FL.)
 Read Tweety Bird

Reality 
 Reality Easy Raider
 Just Escapade

Rearwin 
(Rearwin Aircraft & Engines Inc.)
 Rearwin Ken-Royce
 Rearwin Junior 3000
 Rearwin Junior 4000
 Rearwin Speedster 6000
 Rearwin Sportster 7000
 Rearwin Cloudster 8000
 Rearwin Sportster 8500
 Rearwin Sportster 9000
 Rearwin C-102
 Rearwin 175 Skyranger

Reaver 
(J P Reaver / Nicholas-Beazley Airplane Co, Marshal MO.)
 Reaver Special

Reberry
(Brian Reberry)
 Reberry 3M1C1R

Red Ball 
(Ward D Hiner, Fort Wayne IN.)
 Red Ball A
 Red Ball 1928 Biplane

Red Bird 
(Red Bird Aircraft Co (pres: Harry Frey), Bern KS; Oklahoma City OK.)
 Red Bird 1928 Biplane

Red Wing 
(Red Wing Airplane Club, Cicero IL.)
 Red Wing Trainer

Redback Aviation
(Hoppers Crossing, Victoria, Australia)
 Redback Buzzard
 Redback Aviation Spider

Redfern 
(Walter "Wimpy" W. Redfern, Post Falls, Idaho, United States)
 Redfern DH-2
 Redfern Fokker Dr.1
 Redfern Nieuport 17/24

Reece 
(Paul Reece, Brownstown IL.)
 Reece Rocket

Reedholm 
(Wilmer A Reedholm, Lanyon IA.)
 Reedholm 1926 Monoplane

Reflex Fiberglass Works
(Walterboro, South Carolina, United States)
Reflex White Lightning
Reflex Lightning Bug

Reflex Paramoteur
(Chatou, France)
Reflex Classic
Reflex Bi Trike
Reflex Dynamic
Reflex J 160
Reflex J 320
Reflex S
Reflex Solo Elec
Reflex Top Box

Regent 
(Rocket Aircraft Sales Corp (Pirtle Aircraft Co), Henderson TX.)
 Regent Rocket
 Regent Rocket 185
 Regent Texas Bullet

Reggiane 
(Officine Meccaniche "Reggiane" S.A.)
 Reggiane Re.2000 Falco
 Reggiane Re.2001 Falco II
 Reggiane Re.2002 Ariete
 Reggiane Re.2003
 Reggiane Re.2004 
 Reggiane Re.2005 Bifusoliera
 Reggiane Re.2005 Sagittario
 Reggiane Re.2006
 Reggiane Re.2007
 Reggiane Re.2008

Régnier
(Carlos Régnier)
 Régnier 12

Reid 
(Donald (or Walter) E Reid, Ashbury Park NJ.)
 Reid Rambler

Reid 
(W T Reid Aircraft Co, Montreal Canada.)
 Reid RFS Commander a.k.a. Reid Flying Submarine

Reid and Sigrist 
 R.S.1 (unofficially (?) the "Snargasher")
 R.S.3 Desford
 R.S.4 Bobsleigh

Reims Aviation
 Reims F150
 Reims F152
 Reims F172
 Reims F177
 Reims F182
 Reims F337
 Reims-Cessna F406
 Reims RA 110

Reissner
(Prof. Hans Reissner)
 Reissner Ente

Remos
(Remos Aircraft Company GmbH,)
 Remos GX
 Remos G3 Mirage
 Remos G3 Mirage S
 Remos G3 Mirage RS
 Remos G3 Mirage RS/L
 Remos G3 Mirage ARF
 Remos G3/600
 Remos G3 RaLi
 Remos GX eLite

RemSchetMash 
 RemSchetMash Robust

Renard
(Société Anonyme de Avions et Moteurs Renard / Alfred Renard) 
 Renard Epervier

Renard
(Constructions Aéronautiques G. Renard / Georges Renard)
 Renard 16/100
 Renard R.17 100 hp Renard engine
 Renard R.18 Similar to the RSV.18-100, a single engine monoplane two seater with a 100 hp Renard engine.  
 Renard R.30
 Renard R.31
 Renard R.32
 Renard R.33
 Renard R.34
 Renard R.35
 Renard R.36
 Renard R.37
 Renard R.37B Low-wing monoplane fighter; a separate project saw the design for the R.37B 14N two-seat attack variant.
 Renard R.38
 Renard R.40
 Renard R.42
 Renard R.44
 Renard R.46

Renaudeau
 Renaudeau Avia Sport

Renault
(Société des Moteurs Renault-Aviation)
 Renault O1

Renegade 
(Renegade Light Sport)
 Renegade Falcon LS
 Renegade Falcon LS 2.0
 Renegade Falcon T

REP 
(Établissements D'aviation Robert-Esnault-Pelterie)
 R.E.P. 1904 glider (1)
 R.E.P. 1904 glider (2)
 R.E.P. 1
 R.E.P. 2
 R.E.P. 2 bis
 R.E.P. B
 R.E.P. D
 R.E.P. E-80
 R.E.P. F
 R.E.P. I-80
 R.E.P. K
 R.E.P. K-80
 R.E.P. N
 R.E.P. triplace militaire
 R.E.P. 1911 Monoplan de Course (Circuit Européen)
 R.E.P. 1911 Biplane
 R.E.P. 1912 Hydro (K on floats)
 R.E.P. Vision Totale
 R.E.P. Parasol single-seater
 R.E.P. Parasol two-seater
 R.E.P. C1

Replica Plans 
 Replica Plans SE.5a

Replogle 
(Ralph Replogle, Camden IN.)
 Replogle 1930 Monoplane

Replogle 
(Merle Replogle, Osceola IN.)
 Replogle Gold Bug
 Replogle Golden Bullet GB-1

Replogle 
(E H Replogle)
 Replogle REP-2

Reppert 
(Merle Reppert, Torrance CA.)
 Reppert T-Aero

Republic 

 Republic AP-9
 Republic AP-63
 Republic AP-75
 Republic AP-76
 Republic AP-100
 Republic EP-106
 Fairchild-Republic A-10 Thunderbolt II
 Fokker/Republic D-24 Alliance
 Republic AT-12 Guardsman
 Republic F-12 Rainbow
 Republic F-84 Thunderjet
 Republic F-84F Thunderstreak
 Republic F-96 Thunderstreak
 Republic RF-84F Thunderflash
 Republic F-84H Thunderscreech
 Republic F-106 Thunderscreech
 Republic F-91 Thunderceptor
 Republic F-103
 Republic F-105 Thunderchief
 Republic OA-15
 Republic P-43 Lancer
 Republic P-44 Rocket
 Republic P-47 Thunderbolt
 Republic P-69
 Republic P-72
 Republic R-12 Rainbow
 Republic 2-PA Guardsman
 Republic RC-1 Thunderbolt Amphibian
 Republic RC-2 Rainbow
 Republic RC-3 Seabee
 Republic-Ford JB Loon (US built V.1)
 Republic Lark

Repülőgépgyár 
 Repülőgépgyár Levente

Retz 
((Robert E) Retz Aero Shop, Farmland IN.)
 Retz R-1
 Retz R-2
 Retz R-3
 Retz R-4
 Retz R-5
 Retz R-10

Revolution
(Revolution Helicopter Corp Inc (pres: Dennis Fetters), Excelsior Springs MO.)
 Revolution Mini-500

Rex
(Rex Monoplane Co, South Beach, Staten Island NY.)
 Rex 1912 Monoplane

Rex 
(Flugmaschine Rex G.m.b.H.)
 Rex single seat Scout 1915
 Rex single seat Scout 1916
 Rex single seat Scout 1917

Rex Smith Aeroplane Company 
 Rex Smith Biplane

Rey
 Rey R.1

Rh

Rheden
(Cuno Rheden, Chicago IL.)
 Rheden 1922 Monoplane

RFB 
(Rhein Flugzeugbau GmbH)
 Rhein Flugzeugbau RW 3 Multoplan
 RFB/Grumman American Fanliner
 RFB Fantrainer
 RFB X-114
 RFB X-117
 RFB RF-1 V1
 RFB RF-1 V2
 RFB Sirius II
 Rockwell/MBB Fan Ranger

Rhein-West-Flug Fischer 
(Germany)
 RWF Fibo 2a
 RW 3A Multoplan

Rheinland
(Fliegerschule Rheinland)
 Rheinland FR-2 Schwalbe

Rhoades
(Charles Rhoades, Lock Haven PA)
 Rhoades Twin Piper

Rhodes Berry
(Rhodes Berry Co, Los Angeles CA.)
 Rhodes Berry Silver Sixty

Ri

Ric-Jet
(Ric-Jet Systems Research & Development, Los Angeles CA.)
 Ric-Jet 4

Ricci
(Umberto Ricci & Ettore Ricci)
 Ricci 1912 triple-tandem hydroplane
 Ricci R-1 1. pontoons with open girder tail supports, 2. full length hulls
 Ricci R-2
 Ricci R-3 project
 Ricci R-4 project
 Ricci R-5 built by Officine E. Cantieri Montofano in 1923 (JAWA 1923)
 Ricci R-6
 Ricci R-7
 Ricci R-9
 Ricci R.I.B
 Ricci-Vaugean-Gargiulo A.V.3 airship

Rice
(James L Rice, Van Wert OH.)
 Rice Special

Rich
((Nelson B) Rich Airplane Co, Springfield MA.)
 Rich-Twin 1-X-B

Richard
(C H Richard Co, Lancaster CA.)
 Richard 125 Commuter
 Richard 150 Commuter
 Richard 190 Sportplane

Richard 
 Richard TOM-1

Richard-Penhoët
 Richard-Penhoët 2

Richardson
(H C Richardson, Othello WA.)
 Richardson 1909 Biplane

Richardson
(Archibald and Mervyn, Sydney Australia)
 Richardson 1914 monoplane

Richardson
(B E Richardson, Grand Rapidw MI.)
 Richardson 1911 Monoplane

Richardson
((A S) Richardson Aeroplane Corp Inc, Lowell MA)
 Richardson N-1

Richmond
(Richmond Airways Inc, Greenridge (Staten Island) NY.)
 Richmond Sea Hawk

Richmond
 See Hudson & O'Brien

Richter 
(Klaus J. Richter Ingenieurbüro)
 DeRic DE 13P Delta-Ente

Rickman
(New York NY.)
 Rickman 1909 man-powered umbrella wing

RIDA
 RIDA Aleks 251<ref name=JAWA2007-2008>{{cite book |last=Jackson |first=Paul, MRAeS |title=Jane's all the Worlds Aircraft 2007-2008 |year=2008 |publisher=Jane's Publishing Group |location=London |isbn=978-0710627926}}</ref>
 RIDA 256

Rider
(Keith Rider, San Francisco CA)
 Rider B-1
 Rider R-1
 Rider R-2
 Rider R-3
 Rider R-4
 Rider R-5
 Rider R-6

 Rieseler 
 Rieseler R.I Sportflugzeug Parasol
 Rieseler R.II Sportflugzeug Parasol
 Rieseler R.III

 Rieseler 
(Walter Rieseler at Berlin-Johannistal)
 Rieseler R.I helicopter
 Rieseler R.II helicopter

 Rietti 
(Ariel Ciro Rietti)
 Rietti Golondrina V

Rigault
(Paul Rigault)
 Rigault RP.01A
 Rigault RP.01B

Rigault-Deproux
(Maurice & Paul rigault & Jacques Deproux)
 Rigault-Deproux RD.01
 Rigault-Deproux RD.02
 Rigault-Deproux RD.03

Riggs-Weeks
(Eugene Augustus "Gus" Riggs, Terre Haute IN; 1913: add Lloyd Wehr; c.1913: add Elling O Weeks.)
 Riggs 1912 Biplane
 Riggs-Weeks 1913 Biplane
 Riggs-Wehr 1915 Biplane

Rihn Aircraft
(Dan Rihn, United States)
Rihn DR-107 One Design
Rihn DR-109

 Rikugun 
 Rikugun Ki-93

Riley
(Theron G Riley (aero engr), 923-925 Mary St, Flint MI.)
 Riley Special

 Riley 
(Riley Aeronautics Corp, Ft Lauderdale FL.)
 Riley 55 Twin Navion (Temco D-16, not the Camair Twin Navion)
 Riley 65
 Riley 310R
 Riley Jet Prop 340
 Riley Jet Prop 421
 Riley Rocket
 Riley Rocket 340
 Riley Rocket 414
 Riley Super 310
 Riley Super 340
 Riley Turbine Eagle 421
 Riley Turbine P-210
 Riley Turbo-Exec 400
 Riley Turbo-Executive
 Riley Dove 400
 Riley Turbo Skyliner
 Riley Turbostream

Rinehart-Whelan
((Howard) Rinehart-(B L) Whelan Co, South Field, Dayton OH.)
 Rinehart-Whelan 1930 Monoplane
 Rinehart-Whelan KAT
 Rinehart-Whelan Rambler a.k.a. Chummy
 Rinehart-Whelan Wren

Rinek
((Charles Norvin) Rinek Mfg Co, Easton PA.)
 Rinek Voisin

Rioux
(René Riout)
 Riout 102T Alérion – Ornithopter

Rippert
 Rippert AI-65

Riter
((Russell) Riter Engineering Corp, Deerfield IL.)
 Riter Special

Ritter
Ritter Special

Ritz
Ritz Model A

Riverside (aircraft constructor)
(Riverside CA.)
 Riverside Penguin

 Rize 
 Rize YS-01

RL

 RLU Aircraft 
(Charles Roloff, Robert Liposky and Carl Unger)
 RLU-1 Breezy

RM

RMC
(Rene M. coutant)
 RMC Type 17

RMT Aviation
(Bad Bocklet, Germany)
RMT Bateleur

Ro

 RoamAIR 
(RoamAIRcraft Corp.)
 RoamAIR WO-29 Sport

Robbins
(Samuel B Robbins, Boise City OK.)
 Robbins Silver Wing

Robbins
(Reggie Robbins, Dallas TX.)
 Robbins Special

Roberts Aircraft
(Roberts Aircraft Corp, Phoenix AZ.)
 Roberts Sparrowhawk

Roberts
(Don Roberts, Noblesville IN.)
 Roberts Chinese Bandit

Roberts
(Roberts Sport Aircraft, Yakima WA.)
 Roberts Sceptre I
 Roberts Sceptre II

Robertson
(Robertson Aircraft Corp, Lambert Field, St Louis MO.)
 Robertson B1-RD
 Robertson RO-154 Rovair

Robertson
((James L) Robertson Development Co, Fort Worth TX. / (James L) Robertson Aircraft Corp, Renton WA.)
 Robertson Skylark SRX-1
 Robertson Skyshark

Robey
(J L Robey, Detroit MI.)
 Robey Speed Aire

Robey
 Robey-Peters Gun-Carrier

 Robin 
 Robin ATL
 Robin HR.100
 Robin HR.100 Royal
 Robin HR.100/180
 Robin HR.100/200B Royal
 Robin HR.100/210 Safari
 Robin HR.100/235TR
 Robin HR.100/250TR
 Robin HR.100/285TR Tiara
 Robin HR.100/320 4+2
 Robin DR.100
 Robin DR.200
 Robin DR.220 2+2
 Robin DR.221 Dauphin
 Robin DR.250 Capitaine
 Robin DR.250-180
 Robin DR.253 Regent
 Robin DR.300
 Robin DR.315 Petit Prince
 Robin DR.330
 Robin DR.340 Major
 Robin DR.360 Chevalier
 Robin DR.400
 Robin DR.500 Président
 Robin R.1180 Aiglon
 Robin R.2000
 Robin R.2100A
 Robin R.2112 Alpha
 Robin R.2160 Alpha Sport
 Robin R.2160 Acrobin
 Robin R.3000
 Robin R.3100
 Robin R.3120
 Robin R.3140
 Robin R.3160
 Robin R.3180
 Robin X4

Robinson
(Hugh Robinson, Joplin and St Louis MO.)
 Robinson 1908 Monoplane
 Robinson 1915 Biplane
 Robinson R-13

Robinson
(Arthur J Robinson, Sheridan WY.)
 Robinson 1909 Monoplane

Robinson
(William C "Billy" Robinson, Grinnell IA.)
 Robinson 1913 Monoplane
 Robinson 1915 Biplane

Robinson
(Miami Aircraft Co (fdr: S D Robinson), RFD 2, Miami OK.)
 Robinson Special A-1

Robinson
(James T Robinson, Los Angeles., RFD 2, Miami OK.)
 Robinson Sailaire

Robinson
(William F "Billie" Robinson, Burbank CA.)
 Robinson Banger Bill

Robinson
(M D Robinson, High Point NC.)
 Robinson MDR-1 Special

Robinson
(Cleo Robinson, Phillipsburg KS.)
 Robinson Mere Merit

 Robinson 
(Robinson Helicopter Co. (fdr: Frank D. Robinson), Torrance CA.)
 Robinson R22
 Robinson R44 & R44 Raven I/II
 Robinson R66

 Robinson Aircraft Co 
 Robinson Redwing

Robinson-Christensen-Wright
(James Robinson & Earle Christensen & Leslie Wright, Los Angeles CA.)
 Robinson-Christensen-Wright Firefly

 Roche 
 Guerchais-Roche T.35

Roché-Dohse
((Jean A) Roché-(John Quintin) Dohse, 28 Watts St, Dayton OH.)
 Roché-Dohse Flying Flivver

Rocheville
((Charles & Harry) Rocheville Aircraft Corp Ltd/Rocheville Ltd, 3510 Percy St, Los Angeles CA.)
 Rocheville 1923 Monoplane
 Rocheville 1927 Monoplane
 Rocheville Special
 Rocheville A
 Rocheville Arctic Tern
 Rocheville Flying Wing
 Rocheville R-2
 Rocheville VC-2 a.k.a. VCM-1

Rock Island
(Aviation Div, Rock Island Oil & Refining Co Inc, Hutchinson KS)
 Rock Island Monarch 26

Rocket
(Rocket Aircraft Corporation)
 Rocket 185

 Rocket Racing League 
 RRL Mark-I X-Racer
 RRL Mark-II X-Racer
 RRL Mark-III X-racer

 Rocketplane Limited, Inc. 
 Rocketplane XP

 Rockwell 
 Rockwell 100
 Rockwell 500
 Rockwell 520
 Rockwell 560
 Rockwell 680
 Rockwell 685
 Rockwell 700
 Rockwell 710
 Rockwell 720
 Rockwell 840
 Rockwell 980
 Rockwell 1000
 Rockwell Commander 111
 Rockwell Commander 112
 Rockwell Commander 114
 Rockwell Commander 212
 Rockwell Courser Commander
 Rockwell Hawk Commander
 Rockwell Turbo Commander
 Rockwell NR-349
 Rockwell Ranger 2000
 Rockwell Sabreliner
 Rockwell Space Shuttle
 Rockwell Thrush Commander
 Rockwell B-1 Lancer
 Rockwell T-2 Buckeye
 Rockwell V-10 Bronco
 Rockwell FV-12A
 Rockwell X-30 NASP
 Rockwell-MBB X-31
 Rockwell/MBB Fan Ranger
 Rockwell HiMAT

Rocky Mountain Wings
 Rocky Mountain Wings Ridge Runner

Roe

 Roe I Biplane
 Roe I Triplane
 Roe II Triplane
 Roe III Triplane
 Roe IV Triplane
 Roe-Duigan 1911
 Roe Type D
 Roe Type E
 Roe Type F
 Roe Type G
 Roe-Burga monoplane

Roehrig
(B F Roehrig, San Diego CA.)
 Roehrig 1910 Biplane

Roepkin
(Casten A Roepkin, Dayton OH.)
 Roepkin 1928 Monoplane

Roesgen 
(Emile Roesgen possibly also Rösgen)
 Roesgen EPR-301

Rogalski and Wigura
Rogalski and Wigura R.W.1

Rogers
(Hyattsville MD.)
 Rogers 1910 Monoplane

Rogers
((John W) Rogers Aircraft Corp, Los Angeles CA.)
 Rogers A-1
 Rogers C-1
 Rogers Monoplane

Rogers
(Rogers Aeronautical Mfg Co, Roosevelt Field, Long Island NY.)
 Rogers Sea Eagle RBX
 Rogers Sea Hawk

Rogers Aircraft
(Riverside, California, United States)
Rogers Sportaire

Rogers-Day
(Rogers Construction Co, Gloucester NJ.)
 Rogers-Day 1922 Biplane

 Rogožarski 
(Prva Srpska Fabrika Aeroplana Zivojin Rogožarski A.D.)
 Rogožarski AZR
 Rogožarski IK-3
 Rogožarski PVT - two-seat advanced trainer (1934)
 Rogožarski PVT-H  floatplane (1934)
 Rogožarski R-100
 Rogožarski R-313
 Rogožarski SIM-VI
 Rogožarski SIM-VI-A
 Rogožarski SIM-VIII
 Rogožarski SIM-Х
 Rogožarski SIM-Xa
 Rogožarski SI-GIP
 Rogožarski SIM-XI
 Rogožarski SIM-XII-H - primary trainer floatplane (1936)
 Rogožarski SIM-XIV-H - coastal reconnaissance floatplane (1940)
 Rogožarski SIM-XIVB–H
 Rogožarski Brucoš
 Rogožarski Fizir F1V
 Zmaj Fizir FN

Rohner
(Oscar A Rohner, Aurora CO.)
 Rohner 1929 Monoplane

Rohr
((Fred H) Rohr Aircraft Corp, Chula Vista CA.)
 Rohr 2-175
 Rohr Guppy
 Rohr MR-1
 Rohr M.O.1
 Rohr PB2Y-3R

Rohrbach
(Rohrbach Metall-Flugzeugbau G.m.b.h.)
 Rohrbach Ro I
 Rohrbach Ro II
 Rohrbach Ro III
 Rohrbach Ro IIIa Rodra
 Rohrbach Ro IV Inverness
 Rohrbach Ro V Rocco
 Beardmore Inflexible
 Rohrbach Ro VII Robbe I
 Rohrbach Ro VIIa Robbe I
 Rohrbach Ro VIIb Robbe II
 Rohrbach Ro VIII Roland
 Rohrbach Ro IX Rofix
 Rohrbach Ro X Romar
 Rohrbach Ro XI Rostra
 Rohrbach Ro XII Roska
 Rohrbach Roterra
 Rohrbach Projekt A

 Roko Aero 
(Roko Aero a.s., Zlin, Czech Republic)
 Roko Aero NG4

Rokospol Aviation
(Prague, Czech Republic)
Rokospol Via

 Roland 
(Luft-Fahrzeug-Gesellschaft)
See:LFG Roland

Roland Aircraft
(Mendig, Germany)
Roland Me 109 Replica
Roland S-STOL
Roland Z-120
Roland Z-602

 Rolandas Kalinauskas 
 Rolandas Kalinauskas RK-1 Swallow 
 Rolandas Kalinauskas RK-2 Lightning
 Rolandas Kalinauskas RK-3 Wind
 Rolandas Kalinauskas RK-4 Minija
 Rolandas Kalinauskas RK-5 Ruth
 Rolandas Kalinauskas RK-6 Magic
 Rolandas Kalinauskas RK-7 Orange
 Rolandas Kalinauskas RK-8
 Rolandas Kalinauskas RK-9 Palanga

 Rolladen-Schneider 
 Rolladen-Schneider LS1
 Rolladen-Schneider LSD Ornith
 Rolladen-Schneider LS2
 Rolladen-Schneider LS3
 Rolladen-Schneider LS4
 Rolladen-Schneider LS5
 Rolladen-Schneider LS6
 Rolladen-Schneider LS7
 Rolladen-Schneider LS8
 Rolladen-Schneider LS9
 Rolladen-Schneider LS10
 Akaflieg Köln LS11

 Rolland 
(Jean-Louis Rolland)
 Rolland 200BT Cobra

Rolland
(Yves Rolland, Cicero IL.)
 Rolland 1914 Monoplane

 Rollason 
 Rollason Beta
 Rollason Condor
 Rollason Turbulent

Roll Flight
(Schwelm, Germany)
Roll Flight Duo
Roll Flight MR V

 Rolls-Royce 
 Rolls-Royce Thrust Measuring Rig
 Rolls-Royce ACCEL

 RomBAC 
 RomBAC 1-11

Romano
(Eugene Romano Aerial Navigation Co, Seattle WA.)
 Romanoplane

Romano
(Chantiers Aéronavales Etienne Romano)
 Romano R.1
 Romano R.3
 Romano R.4
 Romano R.5
 Romano R.6
 Romano R.15
 Romano R.16
 Romano R.80
 Romano R.82
 Romano R.83
 Romano R.90
 Romano R.92
 Romano R.110
 Romano R.120

 Romeo 
(Aeroplani Romeo, Napoli)
(The aircraft branch of Alfa-Romeo, built at Meridionali - IMAM - Industrie Meccaniche e Aeronautiche Meridonali)
See Meridionali

Root
(L F Root, Compton CA.)
 Root Sport

Roques-Lefolcalvez
 Roques-Lefolcalvez monoplane

 Rose 
(David Rose, La Jolla, CA)
 Rose RP-4
 Rose JL-70 Rose's Rocket

 Rose 
((Jack W) Rose Aeroplane & Motor Co, 3521 Armitage Ave, Chicago IL.)
 Rose A-1 Parakeet
 Rose A-2 Parakeet
 Rose A-3 Parakeet
 Rose A-4 Parakeet
 Rhinehart-Rose A-4C Parakeet

 Rosebrugh 
(Roy H. Rosebrugh)
 Rosebrugh R.R.1 Special

 Rosenhan 
(Cort A Rosenhan, Midvale UT.)
 Rosenhan Model A

 Roshon 
(J W Roshon,Harrisburg PA.)
 Roshon 1908 multiplane

 Ross 
((Orrin E) Ross Aircraft Co, Amityville NY.)
 Ross Parasol RS-1
 Ross Parasol RS-2

 Ross 
 Ross R-2 Ibis
 Ross R-6
 Ross RH-3
 Ross RS-1 Zanonia
 Ross-Johnson RJ-5

Rossi Soavi Paolo
(Camposanto, Italy)
Rossi Shuttle Quik

 Rossy 
 Wingsuit

 Rosto 
(Oliver Andre Rosto (Ole Augustinussen Røstø), Duluth MN.)
 Rosto Duluth 1

 Rotec 
(Rotec Engineering)
 Rotec Panther
 Rotec Rally 1
 Rotec Rally 2
 Rotec Rally 2B
 Rotec Rally Sport
 Rotec Rally 3

 Roteron 
(Roteron Inc, CA.)
 Roteron X-100

 Roth 
((Alfred R) Roth Aircraft Co, Chicago IL.)
 Roth A

Rotary Air Force
 RAF2000

 Rotor Flight Dynamics 
(Rotor Flight Dynamics Inc, Wimauma, Florida, United States)
 Rotor Flight Dynamics Dominator UltraWhite
 Rotor Flight Dynamics Dominator Single
 Rotor Flight Dynamics Dominator Tandem
 Rotor Flight Dynamics LFINO

 Rotor Master 
(Rotor Master Aircraft, San Diego CA.)
 Rotor Master Darby D-5G Boomerang

 Rotor Sport 
(Rotor Sport Helicopters Inc, Milnesville PA.)
 Rotor Sport Coupe RSH-1A

 Rotor Wing 
(Rotor Wing Systems)
 Rotor Wing No 1

Rotorcraft
(Rotorcraft Ltd., UK)
 Rotorcraft Grasshopper

Rotorcraft
(Rotorcraft SA (Pty) Limited)
 Rotorcraft Minicopter

 Rotorcraft 
(Rotorcraft Corp (pres: Gilbert McGill), 1850 Victory Blvd, Glendale CA.)
 Rotorcraft flying A-frame
 Rotorcraft Dragonfly
 Rotorcraft Heli-Jeep
 Rotorcraft RH-1 Pinwheel
 Rotorcraft XR-11 Dragonfly
 Rotorcraft XH-11 Dragonfly
 Rotorcraft X-2A

Rotorschmiede
(Rotorschmiede GmbH)
 Rotorschmiede VA115

 RotorSport UK 
 RotorSport UK Calidus
 RotorSport UK MT-03

Rotortec
(Görisried, Allgäu, Germany)
Rotortec Cloud Dancer I
Rotortec Cloud Dancer II
Rotortec Cloud Dancer Light

Rotorvox
 Rotorvox C2A

 RotorWay 
(RotorWay (pres: John Netherwood), 4140 W Mercury Way, Chandler AZ. c.1970: Tempe AZ.)
 RotorWay Elite
 RotorWay Exec 90
 RotorWay Exec 162F
 RotorWay Scorpion
 RotorWay A600 Talon
 RotorWay 300T Eagle
 RotorWay Scorpion Too
 RotorWay Scorpion 133
 RotorWay Scorpion 145
 Rotorway Windstar

 Rotorwing 
(Rotorwing Aircraft Comp, Birmingham AL.)
 Rotorwing Sportsman

Rotorwing-Aero
 Rotorwing-Aero 3D-RV

 Rouffaer 
((Jan) Rouffaer Aircraft Corp, Oakland Airport, Oakland CA.)
 Rouffaer R-6

 Rousch 
((Berl & Charles) Rousch Bros Battery Co, 303 N Gross St, Robinson IL)
 Rousch 1928 Biplane

 Rouse 
(W Stewart Rouse, Chicago IL.)
 Rouse 1928 Monoplane

Roussel
(Jacques Roussel)
 Roussel 10
 Roussel R-30

Roussel
(Jean Roussel - brother of Jacques Roussel)
 Roussel 40 Hirondelle

 Rover (canard delta) 
 Rover (canard delta)

Rowe
(David rowe)
 Rowe UFO

 Rowinski 
(Nick Rowinski, Milwaukee WI.)
 Rowinski Racer
 Rowinski TM-1 Sport

Rowley
(76th Fighter Squadron Inc, Meadow Lake Airport, Colorado, United States)
Rowley P-40F

 Roy-Mignet 
(Guy Roy)
 Roy-Mignet GR.01

 Royal 
(Royal Aircraft Factory, Garden City NY.)
 Royal Bird

 Royal 
(Royal Aircraft Corp, Royal Oak MI.)
 Royal Trainer

 Royal 
(Royal Aero Corp (pres: H C Miller), Los Angeles CA.)
 Royal Duster A-1

 Royal Aircraft Factory 
 Royal Aircraft Factory B.E.1
 Royal Aircraft Factory B.E.2
 Royal Aircraft Factory B.E.3
 Royal Aircraft Factory B.E.4
 Royal Aircraft Factory B.E.8
 Royal Aircraft Factory B.E.11
 Royal Aircraft Factory B.E.12
 Royal Aircraft Factory F.E.1
 Royal Aircraft Factory F.E.2
 Royal Aircraft Factory F.E.3
 Royal Aircraft Factory F.E.8
 Royal Aircraft Factory F.E.9
 Royal Aircraft Factory F.E.11
 Royal Aircraft Factory N.E.1
 Royal Aircraft Factory Ram
 Royal Aircraft Factory R.E.1
 Royal Aircraft Factory R.E.5
 Royal Aircraft Factory R.E.7
 Royal Aircraft Factory R.E.8
 Royal Aircraft Factory S.E.2
 Royal Aircraft Factory S.E.4
 Royal Aircraft Factory S.E.5
 Royal Aircraft Factory T.E.1

Royal Institute of Technology
(Royal Institute of Technology (Swedish: Kungliga Tekniska högskolan, abbreviated KTH))
 KTH Osquavia

 Royal Naval dockyard 
(Orlogsvaerftet - Danish Royal Dockyard)
 Orlogsvaerftet HM.II
 Orlogsvaerftet HB.III
 Orlogsvaerftet LB.IV
 Orlogsvaerftet LB.V

Royal Siamese Air Force Manufacturing Division

 Prajadhipok (aircraft)
 Fighter Type 5
 Boripatra
 Bomber Type 2

Royal Thai Air Force
RTAF-2
RTAF-3
RTAF-4 ChantraRTAF-5
RTAF-6

 Royer & Montijo 
 Royer & Montijo California Coupe

 Roza 
(Arthur Roza, Chicago IL.)
 Roza Sport

Rr

RRA
(Ronchetti Razzetti Aviación SA)
 RRA J-1 Martin Fierro

RRAA
(Reconstructions Répliques Avions Anciens)
 RRAA Mosquito 0.75

RRG
(RRG - Rhön-Rossitten Gesellschaft - Rhön-Rossitten Society)
 RRG Storch V

Ru

Rubik
(Ernő Rubik - father of the Rubik's Cube inventor
 Rubik R-01(MSrE M-20)
 Rubik R-02 (MSrE M-19)
 Rubik R-03 Szittya I
 Rubik R-04 Szittya I
 Rubik R-05 Vöcsök
 Rubik R-06 Vöcsök
 Rubik R-07 Vöcsök
 Rubik R-08 Pilis
 Rubik R-09 Pilis
 Rubik R-10 Szittya I
 Rubik R-11 Cimbora
 Rubik R-12 Kevély 
 Rubik R-14 Pinty
 Rubik R-15 Koma
 Rubik R-16 Lepke
 Rubik R-17 Móka
 Rubik R-18 Kánya 
 Rubik R-20 (OMRE-OE 1)
 Rubik R-22 Futár glider series including Junius, Super Futár, Standard Futár
 Rubik R-23 Gébics
 Rubik R-25 Mokány
 Rubik R-26 Góbé
 Rubik R-27 Kopé glider
 Rubik R-28 Fém Kánya - [Project] improved R-18 Kánya (metal structure), not built
 Rubik R-32 - light homebuilt aircraft design

Rublich-Hlavkov-Tomasov
(Zdenek Rublich, Zdenek Hlavkov & Karl Tomasov / Orlican Chocen factory)
 Rublich-Hlavkov-Tomasov R-7 Racek

 Rud-Aero 
 Rud Aero RA-2
 Rud Aero RA-3

Rudlicki
(Jerzy Rudlicki)
 Rudlicki glider No.1
 Rudlicki glider No.2
 Rudlicki glider No.3
 Rudlicki glider No.4
 Rudlicki glider No.5
 Rudlicki glider No.6
 Rudlicki glider No.7
 Rudlicki glider No.8
 Rudlicki glider No.9
 Rudlicki R-I

 Ruffy-Baumann 
(Ruffy, Arnell and Baumann Aviation Company / Felix Ruffy and Edouard Baumann / Ruffy and Richard Sayer Arnell from 1917)
 Ruffy-Baumann 50hp trainer (derived from the Caudron C.II which Ruffy-Baumann also licence-built)
 Ruffy-Baumann 60hp trainer (derived from the Caudron C.II which Ruffy-Baumann also licence-built)
 Ruffy-Baumann Advanced Trainer (single-seat / Anzani 6)
 Ruffy-Baumann R.A.B.15 (a.k.a. Elementary Trainer: after mods became Alliance P.1)
 Ruffy-Baumann Elementary Trainer (a.k.a. RAB.15: after mods became Alliance P.1)

Ruhrtaler 
(Ruhrtaler Maschinenfabrik Schwarz und Dyckerhoff)
 Ruhrtaler Ru.3

 Rummell 
(Harry B Rummell, Findlay OH.)
 Rummell 1929 Monoplane

 Rumpler 
(Rumpler Flugzeug-Werke G.m.b.H.)
 Rumpler 3C Taube
 Rumpler 4A
 Rumpler 4A 13
 Rumpler 4A 14
 Rumpler 4A 15
 Rumpler 4B 1
 Rumpler 4B 2
 Rumpler 4B 11
 Rumpler 4B 12
 Rumpler 4C
 Rumpler 4E (flying boat)
 Rumpler 5A 2
 Rumpler 5A 3
 Rumpler 5A 4
 Rumpler 5A 15
 Rumpler 5A 16
 Rumpler 6A 2
 Rumpler 6A 5
 Rumpler 6A 6
 Rumpler 6A 7
 Rumpler 6B 1
 Rumpler 6B 2
 Rumpler 6G 2
 Rumpler 7C 1
 Rumpler 7D 1
 Rumpler 7D 2
 Rumpler 7D 3 
 Rumpler 7D 4
 Rumpler 7D 5
 Rumpler 7D 6
 Rumpler 7D 7
 Rumpler 7D 8
 Rumpler 8C 13
 Rumpler 8C 14
 Rumpler 8D 1
 Rumpler B.I
 Rumpler C.I
 Rumpler C.III
 Rumpler C.IV
 Rumpler C.IV Limousine (DLR airliner conversions)
 Rumpler C.V
 Rumpler C.VI
 Rumpler C.VII
 Rumpler C.VIII
 Rumpler C.IX
 Rumpler C.X
 Rumpler D.I
 Rumpler G.I
 Rumpler G.II
 Rumpler G.III
 Rumpler Taube
 Rumpler Eindecker
 Rumpler C type experimental

 Runnels 
(Russell W Runnels, Wilmington OH.)
 Runnels Ruby RR-1

 Rupe 
(Gerald Rupe, Portland IN.)
 Rupe R-6 Mate

 Rupert 
(Walter Rupert, Beaverton OR.)
 Rupert Special

 Rupert Aeronaves
(Charles Rupert Jones)
 Rupert B-7
 Rupert R-9
 Rupert R-11

 Ruschmeyer 
(Ruschmeyer Luftfahrttechnik)
 Ruschmeyer MF-85
 Ruschmeyer R 90
 Ruschmeyer R 95

 Russell 
(George F Russell, Mineola NY.)
 Russell 1911 Biplane

 Russell 
((Charles) Russel Aircraft, Malden MO.)
 Russell Aggie
 Russell BR-1

 Russell 
(Charles E Russell/Frank H Russell (?), Salt Lake City UT OR Ft Worth TX (?).)
 Russell Sport

 Russell 
(Michael Russell)
 Russell Acro

Russian Gyroplanes
 Russian Gyroplanes Gyros-1 Farmer
 Russian Gyroplanes Gyros-2 Smartflier

Russian miscellaneous Constructors (pre-1918)
 AIS 1917 torpedo carrier (Aviatsionnaya Ispitatelnaya Stantsiya, Morskaya Vedomsfva - naval air test station)
 Bezobrazov 1914 fighter (Aleksandr A. Bezobrazov)
 BIS 1 1910 pusher biplane (Bylinkin/Iordan/Sikorsky)
 BIS 2 1910 tractor biplane (wings of BIS 1 used with new fuselage)
 Bylinkin 1910 monoplane (Fidor Ivanovich Bylinkin)
 ChUR No.1 1912 monoplane (G.G. Chechet/M.K. Ushkov/N.V. Rebikov)
 Dybovskii 1913 monoplane Delfin - Dolphin (Lt. Viktor V. Dybovskii)
 Izhorskii 6-engined biplane bomber
 Izhorskii 6-engined triplane bomber
 Karpeka 1910 biplane (No's 1-4 all similar) (Aleksandr Danilovich Karpeka)
 Keburiya 1909 glider (Vissarion Savelyevich Keburiya)
 Keburiya 1912 monoplane
 Keburiya 1913 monoplane
 Kostovich 1911 (Ogneslav Stefanovich Kostovich)
 Kostovich 1914 seaplane
 Kostovich 1916 monoplane amphibian
 Kress 1900 seaplane (Vasilii Vasilyevich {Wilhelm} Kress)
 Kudashyev 1 1910 biplane (first flight of Russian aircraft 23 May 1910) (Aleksandr Sergeyevich Kudashyev)
 Kudashyev 2 1910 biplane
 Kudashyev 3 1910 monoplane
 Kudashyev 4 1911 monoplane
 LYaM 1912 monoplane (Maksim Germanovich Lerke, Georgii Viktorovich Yankovski and F.E. Moska)
 Mozhaiskii 1884 steam powered monoplane (Aleksandr Fedorovich Mozhaiskii)
 Rudlitsky 1911 biplane (Georgii Valeryevich Rudlitsky) (Is this the Jerzy Rudlicki that developed the V-tailin Poland during the 1920s and '30s?)
 Savelyev 1916 Quadruplane (Vladimir Fedorovich Savelyev)
 Shishmaryev GASN (Gidro-Aeroplan Spetsialno Naznachyeniya – seaplane special destination) (Mikhail Mikhailovich Shishmaryev)
 Shkolin 1909 monoplane (Luka Vasilyevich Shkolin)
 Shiukov gliders 1908-1910 (Aleksei Vladimirovich Shiukov)
 Shiukov Utka 1912 canard monoplane
 Slesarev biplane Svyatogor (Vasilii andrianovich Slesarev)
 Slyusarenko 1917 fighter (Vladimir Viktorovich Slyusarenko + wife)
 Slyusarenko biplane
 Steglau No.1 biplane (Ivan Ivanovich Steglau)
 Steglau No.2 biplane
 Steglau No.3 monoplane
 Sveshnikov-Vandom monoplane (Aleksandr Nikolayevich Sveshnikov) (built in France)
 Sveshnikov No.2 monoplane (built in Kiev)
 Sveshnikov No.3 monoplane (built in Kiev)
 Ufimestev No.1 1909 Spheroplan (Anatolii Georgyevich Ufimestev)
 Ufimestev No.2 Spheroplan Villish 1913 monoplane Severenaya Lastochka'' - northern swallow (Aleksandr Yustoosovich Villish)
 Villish VM-1
 Yur'yev 1912 helicopter (Boris Nikolayevich Yur'yev) (Yuriev)

Rust 
(Hilmar & Roy Rust, Waring TX.)
 Rust 1934 Monoplane

Rutan
(Burt Rutan)
 Rutan Boomerang
 Rutan Grizzly
 Rutan SkiGull
 Rutan Solitaire
 Rutan Long-EZ
 Rutan Quickie
 Rutan VariEze
 Rutan VariViggen

Rutan Aircraft Factory 

 Rutan Model 27 Variviggen
 Rutan Model 31 VariEze
 Rutan Model 32 Variviggen SP
 Rutan Model 33 VariEze
 Rutan Model 35 AD-1
 Rutan Model 40 Defiant
 Rutan Model 49
 Rutan Model 54 Quickie
 Rutan Model 61 Long-EZ
 Rutan Model 68 AMSOIL Racer
 Rutan Model 72 Grizzly
 Rutan Model 73 NGT: Three-fifths scale model of Fairchild T-46 trainer
 Rutan Model 74 Defiant
 Rutan Model 76 Voyager: First aircraft to circumnavigate the Earth non-stop
 Rutan Model 77 Solitaire
 Rutan Model 81 Catbird
 Rutan Model 89
 Rutan Model 202 Boomerang

Rw

RWD 
(Stanisław Rogalski, Stanisław Wigura and Jerzy Drzewiecki - up to 1933 then manufactured by DWL - Doświadczalne Warsztaty Lotnicze - experimental aeronautical works)
 RWD 1
 RWD 2
 RWD 3
 RWD 4
 RWD 5
 RWD 6
 RWD 7
 RWD 8
 RWD 9
 RWD 10
 RWD 11
 RWD 13
 RWD 14 Czapla
 RWD 15
 RWD 16
 RWD 17
 RWD 18
 RWD 19
 RWD 20
 RWD 21
 RWD 22
 RWD 23
 RWD 24
 RWD 25 Sokól
 RWD 26
 Kocjan Bᾳk (horse-fly)

Ry

Ryan 
(Ryan Aeronautical)
 Ryan FR Fireball
 Ryan F2R Dark Shark
 Ryan L-10 SCW
 Ryan L-17 Navion
 Ryan L-22 Super Navion
 Ryan NR Recruit
 Ryan O-51 Dragonfly
 Ryan PT-16
 Ryan PT-20
 Ryan PT-21
 Ryan PT-22 Recruit
 Ryan PT-25
 Ryan SOR
 Ryan V-5 Vertifan
 Ryan V-8
 Ryan VZ-3 Vertiplane
 Ryan VZ-11 Vertifan
 Ryan X-13 Vertijet
 Mahoney-Ryan B Brougham
 Mahoney-Ryan X
 Ryan B Brougham
 Ryan C Foursome
 Ryan Flamingo
 Ryan M Brougham
 Ryan Model 28 Fireball
 Ryan Navion
 Ryan NYP (New-York - Paris)
 Ryan SC
 Ryan ST
 Ryan STM
 Ryan Super Navion
 Ryan X-1 Special

Ryan Mechanics 
(Ryan Mechanics Monoplane Co, 145 W Slauson Ave, Los Angeles CA)
 Ryan Mechanics Lone Eagle CM-1

Ryson 
(T Claude Ryan & Son (Jerry D), San Diego CA.)
 Ryson STP-1 Swallow
 Ryson ST-100 Cloudster

References

Further reading

External links

List of rocket planes

 List of aircraft (R)